Replot is an island in the Kvarken ("The Throat"), the narrowest part of the Gulf of Bothnia in the northern part of the Baltic sea. It has about 2,100 inhabitants, almost only Swedish-speaking. Replot was an independent municipality until 1973, when it was consolidated to the municipality of Korsholm, near Vaasa.

The area has been inhabited since before the time of Swedish dominion over Finland; the first habitations can be traced to at least the 11th century and possibly earlier. Today there are four major communities on the island, Replot kyrkoby, Norra Vallgrund, Södra Vallgrund and Söderudden, most of which are served by their own elementary schools, although some closures have occurred in recent years. Since 1997, Replot has been connected to the mainland via the Replot Bridge, replacing the earlier ferry connection which had been in place since 1952.

Replot is part of a larger archipelago and most of the smaller islands around Replot have traditionally been used as fishing camps. Today the buildings are generally used as summer cottages since maritime activities play a large part in the culture of the region.
Fishing is nowadays mostly a recreational activity, but there are still a number of professional fishermen active in Replot.

North of Replot is the island of Björkö, which formerly belonged to the municipality of Björköby, which is also the name of its main village.

A large part of the Replot archipelago has been designated a UNESCO World Heritage Site.

References

External links

 – Site with tourist information for the Replot area
 – Information about the archipelago area around Replot
 – Live webcam of Replot bridge

Former municipalities of Finland
Finnish islands in the Baltic
Korsholm
Landforms of Ostrobothnia (region)